Jonathan Richman is a solo album by Jonathan Richman, released by the Rounder Records label in 1989 and comprising both original material and cover songs. With the exception of "Blue Moon" and "Sleepwalk", the songs were recorded as vocal and guitar solos by Jonathan Richman, who provided percussion with his feet. "I Eat With Gusto, Damn! You Bet" is spoken-word.

Track listing
All tracks written by Jonathan Richman except where noted.

"Malagueña de Jojo" (Marian Banks, Ernesto Lecuona) – 2:08
"Action Packed" (Jack Rhodes) – 2:51
"Everyday Clothes" – 3:01
"Fender Stratocaster" – 2:51
"Blue Moon" (Richard Rodgers, Lorenz Hart) – 3:50
"Closer" – 3:26
"I Eat With Gusto, Damn! You Bet" – 3:50
"Miracles Will Start to Happen" – 3:03
"Sleepwalk" (Santo Farina, Johnny Farina) – 2:09
"Que reste-t-il de nos amours ?" (Charles Trenet) – 1:54
"A Mistake Today for Me" – 2:09
"Cerca" (Spanish version of "Closer") – 3:40

Personnel
Jonathan Richman – vocals, guitar
Curly Keranen – bass on "Blue Moon" and "Sleepwalk"
Ron "Wipeout" Wilson – drums on "Blue Moon" and "Sleepwalk"
Technical
Brennan Totten – producer
Paul Emery – engineer

References

1989 albums
Jonathan Richman albums
Rounder Records albums